The Exchange Hall is a historic Italianate style hall on Quimby Square, at the intersection of Main and School Streets in the village of South Acton, in Acton, Massachusetts.  The -story wood-frame building was built in 1860 by James Tuttle, who ran a dry goods business.  The third floor of the building was an open space used for civic, social, and religious functions.  During the 20th century the building housed the South Acton branch of the local public library.

The building was listed on the National Register of Historic Places in 1986. The building currently serves as an event venue and banquet hall.

See also
National Register of Historic Places listings in Middlesex County, Massachusetts

References

External links
Official web site: Exchangehall.com

Commercial buildings on the National Register of Historic Places in Massachusetts
Cultural infrastructure completed in 1860
Buildings and structures in Acton, Massachusetts
National Register of Historic Places in Middlesex County, Massachusetts